is a Japanese mobile game created by Nitroplus. Developed by NextNinja and published by Good Smile Company, the game was released on iOS and Android in March 2021. A manga adaptation by Masaki Hattori began serialization in Fujimi Shobo's shōnen manga magazine Monthly Dragon Age in June 2022, with its chapters collected into a single tankōbon volumes as of September 2022. An anime television series adaptation by Liden Films aired from July to September 2022.

Premise
The story revolves around some students who are in an ashram, where the students will interact with each other while all of them are being taught about magic and culture.

Characters

Media

Game
The mobile game was unveiled by Nitroplus in September 2019. NextNinja handled the game's development and operation, with Good Smile Company serving as the publisher. Light novel illustrator Shin'ichirō Ōtsuka provided the main character designs, Hajime Ninomae wrote the scenario based on an original story by Nitroplus, and Hideyuki Ashizawa composed the music. The game was originally set for a Q2 2020 release on iOS and Android, before being shifted to February 2021, and then to March 4, 2021. The game will end service on March 31, 2023.

Manga
A manga adaptation by Masaki Hattori, titled , began serialization in Fujimi Shobo's Monthly Dragon Age magazine on June 9, 2022. The first tankōbon volume was released on September 9, 2022.

Anime
In May 2022, it was announced that the game will be adapted as an anime television series, titled Smile of the Arsnotoria the Animation. It is produced by Liden Films and directed by Naoyuki Tatsuwa, with Midori Gotō handling the scripts, Takahiro Kishida adapting Ōtsuka's character designs for animation, and Ryo Takahashi and Ken Itō composing the music. The series aired from July 6 to September 21, 2022, on Tokyo MX and BS NTV. Crunchyroll has licensed the series, and has also began streaming an English dub starting on July 27, 2022.

Episode list

Novel
A spin-off novel by Takaaki Kaima, titled , was published by Enterbrain under their Famitsu Bunko imprint on July 29, 2022.

References

External links
  
  
 

2021 video games
Android (operating system) games
Anime television series based on video games
Crunchyroll anime
Famitsu Bunko
Fujimi Shobo manga
IOS games
Japanese role-playing video games
Liden Films
Manga based on video games
Nitroplus
Shōnen manga
Video games developed in Japan